The title of Baron Burghersh has been created three times in the Peerage of England.

It was first created by writ for Robert de Burghersh on 12 November 1303. Robert had three sons, the eldest of which, named Stephen, became the second Baron. According to modern peerage law, the title would have descended to Maud, Stephen's only daughter, then to her son Sir Walter Paveley, and afterwards to his son, also named Walter. However, there is no evidence that Maud or her descendants ever used the title. After Walter's death the title presumably became abeyant or extinct.

The title was created again by writ for Robert's third son Bartholomew de Burghersh on 25 January 1330. It descended through the families of Despencer and Beauchamp, before becoming abeyant in 1449.

The title was created again on 29 December 1624 for Francis Fane. Francis was made Earl of Westmorland at the same time, and both titles are currently held by Anthony Fane, his descendant.

Barons Burghersh (1303)
Robert de Burghersh, 1st Baron Burghersh (d. 1306)
Stephen de Burghersh, de jure 2nd Baron Burghersh (b. c. 1280–1310)
Maud de Burghersh, de jure et suo jure 3rd Baroness Burghersh (b. 1304)
Walter Paveley, de jure 4th Baron Burghersh (d. 1375)
Walter Paveley, de jure 5th Baron Burghersh (testate 1379) (extinct? abeyant?)

Barons Burghersh (1330)
Bartholomew de Burghersh, 1st Baron Burghersh (bef. 1304–1355)
Bartholomew de Burghersh, 2nd Baron Burghersh (bef. 1329–1369)
Elizabeth le Despencer, suo jure 3rd Baroness Burghersh (1342–1409)
Richard le Despencer, 4th Baron Burghersh (1396–1414)
Isabel de Beauchamp, suo jure 5th Baroness Burghersh (1400–1439)
Henry de Beauchamp, 1st Duke of Warwick, 14th Earl of Warwick, 6th Baron Burghersh (1425–1446)
Anne de Beauchamp, suo jure 15th Countess of Warwick, 7th Baroness Burghersh (1443 or 1434 – 1449)

After Anne's death at the age of five, the Barony of Burghersh fell into abeyance between her aunts. (Her Earldom passed to her aunt Anne Beauchamp, her father Henry's only full sister; her husband Richard Neville then became jure uxoris 16th Earl of Warwick.)

Barons Burghersh (1624)
Francis Fane, 1st Earl of Westmorland, 1st Lord Burghersh (1580–1629)

See here for further succession.

References

Secondary sources

External links 

http://www.thepeerage.com/
http://www.stirnet.com/ (subscription only)

 
1303 establishments in England
Baronies in the Peerage of England
Abeyant baronies in the Peerage of England
Dormant baronies in the Peerage of England
Noble titles created in 1303
Noble titles created in 1330
Noble titles created in 1624